Elections to North Down Borough Council were held on 5 May 2005 on the same day as the other Northern Irish local government elections. The election used four district electoral areas to elect a total of 25 councillors.

Election results

Note: "Votes" are the first preference votes.

Districts summary

|- class="unsortable" align="centre"
!rowspan=2 align="left"|Ward
! % 
!Cllrs
! % 
!Cllrs
! %
!Cllrs
! %
!Cllrs
! %
!Cllrs
!rowspan=2|TotalCllrs
|- class="unsortable" align="center"
!colspan=2 bgcolor="" | DUP
!colspan=2 bgcolor="" | UUP
!colspan=2 bgcolor="" | Alliance
!colspan=2 bgcolor="" | Green
!colspan=2 bgcolor="white"| Others
|-
|align="left"|Abbey
|bgcolor="#D46A4C"|42.1
|bgcolor="#D46A4C"|3
|18.5
|2
|12.0
|1
|6.4
|0
|21.0
|0
|6
|-
|align="left"|	Ballyholme and Groomsport
|bgcolor="#D46A4C"|32.5
|bgcolor="#D46A4C"|2
|22.5
|2
|11.1
|0
|0.0
|1
|33.9
|2
|7
|-
|align="left"|Bangor West
|bgcolor="#D46A4C"|25.9
|bgcolor="#D46A4C"|2
|18.1
|1
|14.9
|2
|19.8
|1
|21.3
|0
|7
|-
|align="left"|Holywood
|25.4
|1
|bgcolor="40BFF5"|31.8
|bgcolor="40BFF5"|2
|31.4
|2
|11.4
|0
|0.0
|0
|5
|- class="unsortable" class="sortbottom" style="background:#C9C9C9"
|align="left"| Total
|31.4
|8
|21.5
|8
|16.0
|6
|9.1
|1
|22.0
|2
|25
|-
|}

Districts results

Abbey

2001: 2 x UUP, 2 x DUP, 1 x Alliance, 1 x UKUP
2005: 3 x DUP, 2 x UUP, 1 x Alliance
2001-2005 Change: DUP gain from UKUP

Ballyholme and Groomsport

2001: 2 x Independent, 2 x UUP, 1 x Alliance, 1 x DUP, 1 x Women's Coalition
2005: 2 x DUP, 2 x UUP, 2 x Independent, 1 x Alliance
2001-2005 Change: DUP gain from Women's Coalition

Bangor West

2001: 2 x UUP, 2 x Alliance, 1 x UKUP, 1 x DUP, 1 x Independent
2005: 2 x DUP, 2 x UUP, 2 x Alliance, 1 x Green
2001-2005 Change: DUP gain from UKUP, Independent joins Greens

Holywood

2001: 2 x UUP, 1 x Alliance, 1 x DUP, 1 x Independent
2005: 2 x UUP, 2 x Alliance, 1 x DUP
2001-2005 Change: Alliance gain from Independent

References

North Down Borough Council elections
North Down